Ballentine is an unincorporated community in Richland County, South Carolina, United States. It is part of the  Columbia, South Carolina metropolitan area.

History
The community was named after the Ballentine family of pioneer settlers.

In 1925, Ballentine had 50 inhabitants.

There have been unsuccessful attempts to incorporate Ballentine as a town.

The John Jacob Calhoun Koon Farmstead was added to the National Register of Historic Places in 1986.

Education
Public education in Ballentine is administered by Lexington & Richland County School District Five, which operates Ballentine Elementary School in the community.

Ballentine has a public library, a branch of the Richland County Library.

References

Unincorporated communities in Richland County, South Carolina
Columbia metropolitan area (South Carolina)
Unincorporated communities in South Carolina